Bad Machines is the fourth studio album from Australian country singer Shane Nicholson, released by Liberation Music in Australia in March 2011. The album peaked at number 29 on the ARIA Charts, becoming Nicholson's first solo album to peak in the top 50. The album spawned the APRA Award winning song "Famous Last Words", which won Best Country Work at the APRA Music Awards of 2012.

The inspiration for the album's title came after Nicholson read Midnight Express by Billy Hayes and William Hoffer, in which a criminal is likened to a "bad machine". Nicholson said this made him ponder "Are we made a certain way in the beginning or is it conditioning? Are we controlled by an Almighty engineer?".

At the ARIA Music Awards of 2011, the album was nominated for ARIA Award for Best Country Album, but lost out to his wife Kasey Chambers' Little Bird, an album he produced.

At the Country Music Awards of Australia in January 2012, the album was nominated for Album of the Year.

Reception
Graham Reid from Elsewhere NZ said the album "covers a lot of territory" and described "Famous Last Words" as "a snappy country-rocker", "The Broken Things" as "a gentle, simple declaration of love", "Fish and Whistle" as "a light gospel-country feel" and "Money for Jam" as "a brooding, almost monotone rocker".

Track listing

Charts

Weekly charts

Year-end charts

Release history

References

2011 albums
Shane Nicholson (singer) albums
Albums produced by Shane Nicholson (singer)
Liberation Records albums